Line 1 of the Xiamen Metro is a subway line in Xiamen. It began operations on 31 December 2017.

History
The 30.3-kilometre long, 24-station first phase of the line commenced construction on 1 April 2014 and tunnelling works were completed in March 2017. Trial runs were held from 6 October 2017 to 11 October 2017 and the line opened to the public on 31 December 2017.

Opening timeline

Stations

Rolling stock

Services on the line are provided by a fleet of six-car, aluminum-bodied trains manufactured by CRRC.

References

01
Railway lines opened in 2017
2017 establishments in China